The men's decathlon event at the 2020 Summer Olympics took place on 4 and 5 August 2021 at the Japan National Stadium. 23 athletes competed.

Background
This was the 25th appearance of the event, having appeared in every Summer Olympics since 1912.

Qualification

A National Olympic Committee (NOC) could enter up to 3 qualified athletes in the men's decathlon event if all athletes meet the entry standard or qualify by ranking during the qualifying period. (The limit of 3 has been in place since the 1930 Olympic Congress.) The qualifying standard is 8350 points. This standard was "set for the sole purpose of qualifying athletes with exceptional performances unable to qualify through the IAAF World Rankings pathway." The world rankings, based on the average of the best five results for the athlete over the qualifying period and weighted by the importance of the meet, will then be used to qualify athletes until the cap of 24 is reached.

The qualifying period was originally from 1 January 2019 to 29 June 2020. Due to the COVID-19 pandemic, the period was suspended from 6 April 2020 to 30 November 2020, with the end date extended to 29 June 2021. The qualifying time standards could be obtained in various meets during the given period that have the approval of the IAAF. Both outdoor and indoor meets are eligible. The most recent Area Championships may be counted in the ranking, even if not during the qualifying period.

NOCs cannot use their universality place in the decathlon.

Men's decathlon 
Entry number: 24.

Competition format
The decathlon consisted of ten track and field events, with a points system that awarded higher scores for better results in each of the ten components. The athletes all competed in one competition with no elimination rounds.

Records
Prior to this competition, the existing world, Olympic, and area records were as follows.

Records set during this event

Schedule
All times are Japan Standard Time (UTC+9)

The men's decathlon took place over two consecutive days, with 5 events each day.

Detailed results

100 metres

Long jump

Shot put 

1 Van Der Plaetsen was forced to retire from the competition after pulling his achillies tendon during his second attempt in the long jump.

High jump

400 metres

110 metres hurdles 

1 Kaul was forced to retire from the competition after pulling a muscle in the 400 meters.

Discus throw

Pole vault

Javelin throw

1500 metres

Overall results 
Key

References 

Men's decathlon
2020
Men's events at the 2020 Summer Olympics